Romania competed at the 2014 Winter Olympics in Sochi, Russia, from 7 to 23 February 2014. A team of 24 athletes in seven sports was announced on 24 January 2014, representing a decline of five athletes from four years prior. The best results were two 17th places in bobsleigh.

Alpine skiing 

According to the final quota allocation released on 20 January 2014, Romania had two male athletes and a female athlete in qualification position.

Biathlon 

Based on their performance at the 2012 and 2013 Biathlon World Championships, Romania qualified 1 man and 1 woman.

Bobsleigh 

Romania had two sleds in qualification position for a total of four athletes.

* – Denotes the driver of each sled

Cross-country skiing 

According to the final quota allocation released on 20 January 2014, Romania had three athletes in qualification position.

Distance

Sprint

Figure skating 

Romania qualified 1 entrant in men's singles.

Luge 

Romania qualified a total of four athletes, and a spot in the team relay for the first time, by virtue of having a sled in all the individual events. The doubles sled (and the mixed relay) could not compete as their sled broke.

Skeleton 

Romania had one athlete in qualification position.

Ski jumping

Romania received the following start quotas:

See also
Romania at the 2014 Summer Youth Olympics

References

External links 
Romania at the 2014 Winter Olympics

Nations at the 2014 Winter Olympics
2014
Winter Olympics